Rhythm-a-Ning is a live album by pianists Kenny Barron and John Hicks recorded as part of the 5th Annual Riverside Park Arts Festival in 1989 and released on the Candid label.

Reception 

In his review on Allmusic, Scott Yanow noted "Kenny Barron and John Hicks are both well-respected veteran pianists whose styles fall well within the modern mainstream of jazz ... Although it can be fun to figure out who is playing what when, Barron and Hicks have such complementary styles that they often sound like one pianist with four hands".

Track listing 
 "Sunshower" (Kenny Barron) – 12:44
 "Naima's Love Song" (John Hicks) – 14:08
 "Blue Monk" (Thelonious Monk) – 14:17
 "After the Morning" (Hicks) – 12:05
 "Ghost of Yesterday" (Arthur Herzog Jr., Irene Kitchings) – 5:36
 "Rhythm-a-Ning" (Monk) – 9:49

Personnel 
Kenny Barron, John Hicks (tracks 1-4 & 6) – Steinway grand piano
Walter Booker – bass 
Jimmy Cobb – drums

References 

Kenny Barron live albums
John Hicks (jazz pianist) live albums
1990 live albums
Candid Records live albums